Athletics competition at the 2007 Games of the Small States of Europe was held from 4–9 June 2007 in Fontvieille, Monaco, at Stade Louis II.

Medal summary

Men

Women

Men's results

100 metres

Heats – June 5Wind:Heat 1: 0.0 m/s, Heat 2: -1.0 m/s

Final – June 5Wind:+0.5 m/s

200 metres
June 9Wind: +0.3 m/s

400 metres

Heats – June 5

Final – June 7

800 metres
June 5

1500 metres
June 5

5000 metres
June 5

10,000 metres
June 9

110 metres hurdles
June 7Wind: -0.4 m/s

400 metres hurdles
June 7

3000 metres steeplechase
June 7

4 x 100 meters relay
June 9

4 x 400 meters relay
June 9

Pole vault
June 5

Long jump
June 7

Triple jump
June 9

Javelin throw
June 5

Women's results

100 metres
June 5Wind: +0.6 m/s

200 metres
June 9Wind: +1.3 m/s

400 metres
June 7

800 metres
June 5

1500 metres
June 7

5000 metres
June 9

10,000 metres
June 5

100 metres hurdles
June 9Wind: +1.4 m/s

400 metres hurdles
June 7

4 x 100 meters relay
June 9

4 x 400 meters relay
June 9

High jump
June 9

Pole vault
June 7

Long jump
June 7

Triple jump
June 5

Shot put
June 9

Discus throw
June 7

Javelin throw
June 5

Medal table

Participating nations

 (14)
 (44)
 (22)
 (3)
 (30)
 (18)
 (22) (Host team)
 (11)

References
Results from Fédération Luxembourgeoise d'Athlétisme
Results from AASSE (archived)

Games of the Small States of Europe Athletics
Athletics
2007
2007 Games of the Small States of Europe Athletics